The Cow Jumped Over the Moon was the first play of Sumner Locke Elliott.

It was performed for a season in Los Angeles. It was seen by scouts from MGM who at one stage reportedly considered it for a vehicle for Billie Burke but decided against it on the grounds it was too similar to The Vinegar Tree.

References

External links
The Cow Jumped Over the Moon at Ausstage

Australian plays
1937 plays